Foreland Island is an island  east-southeast of Taylor Point, off the east side of King George Island, in the South Shetland Islands. This island was known to sealers as early as 1821 and takes its name from North Foreland, the prominent cape  to the northwest.

See also 
 List of antarctic and sub-antarctic islands

References 

Islands of King George Island (South Shetland Islands)